Landscape with Trees is a watercolor piece created in 1883 by Vincent van Gogh.

See also
Early works of Vincent van Gogh

Paintings by Vincent van Gogh
1883 paintings